Luck in Pawn is a 1919 American silent romance film starring Marguerite Clark and directed by Walter Edwards. It was produced by Famous Players-Lasky and distributed through Paramount Pictures. The film is based on a play by Marvin Taylor, Luck in Pawn, and ran briefly on Broadway in 1919.

The film is listed as being preserved at the Library of Congress and New Zealand Film Archive.

Cast
Marguerite Clark as Annabel Lee
Charles Meredith as Richard Standish Norton
Leota Lorraine as Beth Vance
Richard Wayne as Cole Bently
John Steppling as Abraham Armsby
Lillian Langdon as Mrs. Vance
Myrtle Rishell as Mrs. Norton (credited as Myrtle Richelle)
Lydia Knott as Mrs. Lee
Paul Weigel as William Rainier
Thomas Persse as Mr. Vance
Pat Moore as Tommy Lee
Nancy Chase as Rose Naunsell
Dave Allen as Sam Wilzinski

References

External links

 
AllMovie.com

1919 films
American silent feature films
American films based on plays
Paramount Pictures films
Films directed by Walter Edwards
1910s romance films
American black-and-white films
American romance films
1910s American films